Josef Grahsl (born 2 May 1908, date of death unknown) was an Austrian wrestler. He competed in the men's Greco-Roman lightweight at the 1936 Summer Olympics.

References

1908 births
Year of death missing
Austrian male sport wrestlers
Olympic wrestlers of Austria
Wrestlers at the 1936 Summer Olympics
Place of birth missing